John Ralston may refer to:
 John Ralston (actor) (born 1964), Canadian actor
 John Ralston (American football) (1927–2019), American football player and coach
 John Ralston (musician), American rock musician
 John de Ralston (died 1452), Scottish bishop and administrator
 John T. Raulston (1868–1956), Tennessee judge who presided over the 1925 Scopes Trial
 John Steele Ralston (1887–1918), Scottish World War I flying ace
 John G. Ralston, American architect in Iowa
 John Ralston (baritone) (1882–1933), Australian baritone

See also 
 Jon Ralston (born 1959), Las Vegas, Nevada political reporter
 John Ralston Saul (born 1947), Canadian author and essayist
 John Ralston Williams (1874–1965), Canadian-American physician